Crassostrea tulipa, the West African mangrove oyster, is a true oyster in the family Ostreidae.

Habitat/distribution
The mangrove oyster is found in tropical intertidal zones. It grows on the bark of the stilt sections of mangrove trees, which are exposed during low tides and covered during high tides. It can also be found on some other suitable intertidal substrates in its range. This oyster has evolved to survive exposed to the air during low tides. The mangrove oyster is found on West African shorelines.

References

tulipa
Bivalves described in 1819